Sabrana dela (trans. Collected Works) is a 7 piece box set from the Serbian and Yugoslav hard rock band Kerber, released in 2009. Sabrana dela features remastered versions of all six studio albums released by the band, and the previously unreleased track "Sveti Nikola" on the seventh disc.

Track listing

Nebo je malo za sve

Ratne igre

Seobe

Ljudi i bogovi

Peta strana sveta

Zapis

Sveti Nikola

Credits
Goran Šepa - vocals
Tomislav Nikolić - guitar
Branislav Božinović - keyboard
Zoran Žikić - bass guitar
Zoran Stamenković - drums
Dragoljub Đuričić - drums
Branko Isaković - bass guitar
Saša Vasković - bass guitar
Josip Hartl - drums
Vladan Stanojević - acoustic guitar
Goran Đorđević - percussion

References

Sabrana dela at Discogs

External links
Sabrana dela at Discogs

Kerber compilation albums
2009 compilation albums
PGP-RTS compilation albums